Barabazar Bikram Tudu Memorial College is a college at Barabazar in Purulia district, India. It offers undergraduate courses in arts. It is affiliated to Sidho Kanho Birsha University.

Departments

Arts
Bengali
English
History
Geography
Political Science
Sociology
Santali
Sanskrit
Education

See also

References

External links 
 
Sidho Kanho Birsha University
University Grants Commission
National Assessment and Accreditation Council

Colleges affiliated to Sidho Kanho Birsha University
Academic institutions formerly affiliated with the University of Burdwan
Universities and colleges in Purulia district
2006 establishments in West Bengal
Educational institutions established in 2006